Maracaibo is a city and municipality in the Zulia State, Venezuela.

Maracaibo can also refer to:

Geography 
Metropolitan Area of Maracaibo
Maracaibo Basin
Maracaibo Metro
Maracaibo Lake
Maracaibo Lake (Bolivia)
Maracaibo Province (disambiguation)

Other 
Maracaibo (film)

See also